Hunger is a 1986 Australian TV film about a Romanian refugee who settles in Australia.

Production
Nowra wrote the film for Jan Chapman following their successful collaboration on Displaced Persons. He says the subject matter was close to Chapman's heart, and the producer thought it would be a romantic story. However the more research Nowra did, the less romantic he felt the story was and he had a deal of trouble writing it as a love story. He felt swamped with the research and did not like the real life men on whom the story was based. Nowra was not satisfied with the final script, although he said the director did the best he could. Nowra also plays a support role.

References

External links
Hunger at Peter Malone site

Australian television films
1986 television films
1986 films
1980s English-language films